Seria is a town in Belait District, Brunei, about  west from the country's capital Bandar Seri Begawan. The total population was 3,625 in 2016. It was where oil was first struck in Brunei in 1929 and has since become a centre for the country's oil and gas industry.

Name 
The name Seria is an acronym for the South East Reserved Industrial Area. However, the name has become forgotten today.

Geography 
Seria is located within a mangrove swamp and surrounded by an oil field.

The town has a narrow  coast with the South China Sea. It has been identified by BirdLife International as an Important Bird Area (IBA). As well as open sea, it contains tidal mudflats and sandflats, mangroves and beach forest which support populations of various birds, including Bornean crestless firebacks, grey imperial pigeons, short-toed coucals, lesser adjutants, Chinese egrets, Wallace's hawk-eagles, Malay blue-banded kingfishers, and straw-headed bulbuls.

History 

The first oil field was discovered by the British Malayan Petroleum Company (BMPC) in 1929, followed by the completion of the first commercial oil well later that same year in Wild Pigeon's Field on the west bank of the Seria River. Production of oil has already began by 1931, while the first export began in 1932.

During World War II, Seria was one of the first places in Borneo invaded by the Imperial Japanese Army. The Japanese Kawaguchi Detachment came ashore on 16 December 1941, nine days after the Attack on Pearl Harbor. Upon the invasion, the oil field was destroyed by the British forces to prevent being captured by the Japanese. On 28 April 1945, Seria was attacked by the United States Navy which targeted places in the Asia-Pacific occupied by the Japanese forces. The town was liberated by the Australian forces on 29 June 1945; by the time they arrived in Seria, the oil field was heavily burned and only in November in that year that the production was restored. By 1946, the original town had been completely destroyed.

On 13 January 1950, two RAF PR Mk.34 de Havilland DH.98 Mosquitoes (RG254 and PF624) collided and crashed off Seria. The bodies of the crew were buried in Kuala Belait Cemetery. 

During the 1962 Brunei revolt, rebels of the TKNU managed to gain control of Seria, but was soon liberated by the 1/2nd Battalion Gurkha Rifles Regiment and Queen's Own Highlanders on 11 December 1962.  A total of 99 Gurkha Infantry and 3 Commando Brigades were deployed by the British Far East Command.

Administration 
Seria officially constitutes two village subdivisions, in which they are under Mukim Seria:

Seria has also been incorporated as a municipal area since 1959 and is the responsibility of the Kuala Belait and Seria Municipal Board, which also oversees Kuala Belait. The municipal area constitutes  and encompasses parts of the aforementioned village subdivisions, bounded by Jalan Tengah and the Seria Arena to the north, Jalan Lorong Satu Barat to the east, Jalan Bolkiah to the south, and Jalan Lorong Tiga Barat to the west.

Economy

Oil and gas 
The town sits atop the Seria oil field, which was discovered in 1929 and has been continuously in production since then.

The Brunei Shell Petroleum (BSP) Company Limited is headquartered in Panaga and has various facilities related to the oil and gas industry in Seria. The Seria Refinery is the only refinery in Brunei and is located in the Sungai Bera area, together with the Seria Crude Oil Terminal (SCOT), the New Gas Compression Plant (NGCP) and the New Industrial Area (NIA). The open-air oil water treatment facility at the Sungai Bera Holding Basin (SBHB) has since been discontinued due to environmental reasons.

Demography

Religion 
Religions in Seria include Christianity, Sikhism, Hinduism, Islam and Buddhism. Among the Christian churches, there are the St. Margaret's Church and Church of Our Lady of Immaculate Conception.

Transportation

Road
Most of the roads within the municipality are surfaced. There are buses taking passengers to Bandar Seri Begawan and Miri from Seria. The Kuala Belait Highway from the Malaysian border west of Sungai Tujuh, Kuala Belait links up with multiple other highways leading to Bandar Seri Begawan and Muara Town.

Rail
There are no working railways or light rail in Seria. The route and remnants of a  wooden railway from Seria to Badas that was built by the British Malayan Oil Company (now Brunei Shell Petroleum) before the war to service the water supply to Seria from the Badas pumping station on the Sungai Belait are still visible.
BMP staff hid essential components of the railway from the Japanese during World War II who therefore were unable to restore it so it fell into disrepair. When the liberation forces of the Australian 9th Division arrived, these components miraculously re-appeared and the railway was quickly restored to action to carry two 25 pounder guns and ammunition to Badas, to harry a Japanese contingent that was still in the area.

Water
There are no ferry services, river services or port services in Seria. The nearest port is in Kuala Belait, and the nearest deepwater port in Brunei is Muara Port.

Air
There is a privately owned airfield in Anduki that caters mainly for flights to offshore Brunei Shell Facilities. Commercial travellers would have to travel to either Bandar Seri Begawan or Miri to catch a commercial flight. There is one helipad at Panaga Health Centre and at the Brunei Shell Petroleum Headquarters.

A heliport  is located inside the British Army Jungle Warfare Training School. The helicopters belong to the No. 667 Squadron AAC, formerly No. 7 Flight AAC.

Facilities
In 1938, the first Seria Mosque was completed. In 1953, the mosque was rebuilt at a cost of B$250,000.

The British Forces Brunei headquarters was established in Seria, in 1963 by the request of then Sultan Omar Ali Saifuddien III.

The  An-Naem Islamic cemetery was opened in Anduki, in 1993.

Electricity used to be locally generated with a natural gas-fired power plant. The B$20 million solar farm began operation in 2010.

Education 

Schools in Seria include:
 Pengiran Anak Puteri Rashidah Sa'adatul Bolkiah Religious School (Public Islamic Religious School)
 Pengiran Setia Negara Pengiran Mohd Yusof Primary School (Public)
 Muhammad 'Alam Primary School (Public)
 Anthony Abell College (Public)
 IBTE Sultan Bolkiah Campus (Public)
 Chung Ching Middle School (Private - Chinese)
 St. Angela's School (Private - Catholic former All-Girls School, but is now a boys' and girls' school since the merging with St Michael's)
 St. Margaret's School (Private - Anglican, One of the International school in Brunei)
 Panaga Primary School (Public)
 Hornbill School (Private)
St. Michael's Mission School was the first English school in the country. It was a Private Catholic All-Boys School. Due to declining numbers, it was closed down in late 2006 and its student body was merged with the formerly all-girls Catholic school, St. Angela's.

Tourist attractions 
 Pekan Seria Mosque – the oldest surviving mosque in Brunei, built in 1954.
 Seria Energy Lab (SEL) – an interactive museum officiated in 2002 and run by Brunei Shell Petroleum.
 Billionth Barrel Monument – a monument built in 1991, to commemorate the billionth barrel of crude oil produced from the Seria oil field.
 Panaga – home to a resident population of Hornbills

Recreation and sports 
Public recreational activities in Seria are mostly limited to the country clubs (Panaga Club and the Brunei Shell Recreation Club). There is an 18-hole golf course in Panaga Club and an Equestrian area in the Brunei Shell Recreation Club.

Fishing and windsurfing is carried out at the  Anduki Jubilee Recreational Park. It was opened by His Majesty, the Sultan and Yang Di-Pertuan of Negara Brunei Darussalam, in 1992, a contribution from Brunei Shell Petroleum to commemorate the Silver Jubilee of the Sultan to the throne of Brunei.

Notable people
Craig Adams (born 1977), National Hockey League player for the Pittsburgh Penguins. He was born in Seria and raised in Calgary, Alberta, Canada.
Cornelius Sim (1951–2021), first Vicar Apostolic and Cardinal of Brunei.
Norsiah Abdul Gapar (born 1952), a recipient of the S.E.A. Write Award 2009.
Mustappa Sirat (born 1957), a politician and minister.

Gallery

Notes

References 

 

Populated places in Brunei
Municipalities in Brunei
Belait District